Malcolm Archibald Macdonald (June 20, 1875 – October 13, 1941) was a Canadian lawyer, politician and Chief Justice of British Columbia.

Biography
Malcolm Archibald Macdonald was born in Ashfield Township on June 20, 1875. He graduated from Osgoode Hall Law School in 1909 and began the practice of law in London, Ontario. He moved to Cranbrook, British Columbia where he ran for the Liberal Party unsuccessfully in 1909. He moved again to Vancouver in 1912 where he was elected in 1916. He was re-elected in 1920 but resigned in 1921 to run federally (without success), after which he resumed private practice. He was appointed to the British Columbia Court of Appeal in May 1924.  He was appointed Chief Justice of British Columbia in May 1940 and died at his home in Vancouver on October 13, 1941. He was buried in Mountain View Cemetery.

Personal life
He married Lena Baird on October 26, 1910. They had one son together. She died on August 11, 1913. He then remarried, to Ida Williams, on January 1, 1916.

His son James Macdonald also served on the Court of Appeal from 1979 and his son Alex Macdonald was Attorney General from 1972 to 1975.

References

1875 births
1941 deaths
Attorneys General of British Columbia
British Columbia Liberal Party MLAs
Burials at Mountain View Cemetery (Vancouver)
Judges in British Columbia
Lawyers in British Columbia
Osgoode Hall Law School alumni
People from Huron County, Ontario